Longitarsus celticus is a species of beetle in the subfamily Galerucinae that can be found in Austria, Czech Republic, France, Germany, Italy, Spain, Switzerland, Ukraine, and Yugoslavia.

References

C
Beetles described in 1975
Beetles of Europe